This is a list of the native wild mammal species recorded in Greenland. There are 26 mammal species native to Greenland, of which none are critically endangered, three are endangered, three are vulnerable, two are near threatened and four are data deficient. Only seven of these species are fully terrestrial. Introduced species (e.g., the house mouse and brown rat) are not included.

The following tags are used to highlight each species' conservation status as assessed by the International Union for Conservation of Nature; those on the left are used here, those on the right in some other articles:

Order: Rodentia (rodents)

Rodents make up the largest order of mammals, with over 40% of mammalian species. They have two incisors in the upper and lower jaw which grow continually and must be kept short by gnawing.

Suborder: Myomorpha
Family: Cricetidae
Subfamily: Arvicolinae
Genus: Dicrostonyx
 Northern collared lemming, Dicrostonyx groenlandicus LC

Order: Lagomorpha (lagomorphs)

The lagomorphs comprise two families, Leporidae (hares and rabbits), and Ochotonidae (pikas). Though they can resemble rodents, and were classified as a superfamily in that order until the early 20th century, they have since been considered a separate order. They differ from rodents in a number of physical characteristics, such as having four incisors in the upper jaw rather than two.

Family: Leporidae (rabbits, hares)
Genus: Lepus
 Arctic hare, Lepus arcticus LC
 Greenland Arctic hare, L. a. groenlandicus

Order: Carnivora (carnivorans)

There are over 260  species of carnivorans, the majority of which eat meat as their primary dietary item. They have a characteristic skull shape and dentition. Except for walruses and harbor seals, the pinnipeds of Greenland breed on pack ice or shore-fast ice. Walruses are the only local pinniped species to commonly consume warm-blooded prey.

Suborder: Caniformia
Family: Canidae (dogs, foxes)
Genus: Vulpes
 Arctic fox, Vulpes lagopus LC
 Greenland Arctic fox, V. l. foragorapusis
Genus: Canis
 Gray wolf, Canis lupus LC
 Greenland wolf, C. l. orion
Family: Ursidae (bears)
Genus: Ursus
 Polar bear, Ursus maritimus VU
Family: Mustelidae (weasels and relatives)
Genus: Mustela
 Beringian ermine, Mustela erminea LC
Clade Pinnipedia (seals, sea lions and walruses)
Family: Odobenidae
Genus: Odobenus
 Walrus, Odobenus rosmarus VU
Family: Phocidae (earless seals)
Genus: Cystophora
 Hooded seal, Cystophora cristata VU
Genus: Erignathus
 Bearded seal, Erignathus barbatus LC
Genus: Pagophilus
 Harp seal, Pagophilus groenlandicus LC
Genus: Phoca
 Harbor seal, Phoca vitulina LC
Genus: Pusa
 Ringed seal, Pusa hispida LC

Order: Artiodactyla (even-toed ungulates and cetaceans)

The even-toed ungulates are ungulates whose weight is borne about equally by the third and fourth toes, rather than mostly or entirely by the third as in perissodactyls. There are about 220 noncetacean artiodactyl species, including many that are of great economic importance to humans. Caribou hunting in Greenland has both cultural and economic significance.

Family: Cervidae (deer)
Subfamily: Capreolinae
Genus: Rangifer
 Caribou, Rangifer tarandus VU
 Barren-ground caribou, R. t. groenlandicus
 Peary caribou, R. t. pearyi (?)
Family: Bovidae (cattle, antelope, sheep, goats)
Subfamily: Caprinae
Genus: Ovibos
 Muskox, Ovibos moschatus LC

Order: Cetacea (whales, dolphins and porpoises)

The infraorder Cetacea includes whales, dolphins and porpoises. They are the mammals most fully adapted to aquatic life with a spindle-shaped nearly hairless body, protected by a thick layer of blubber, and forelimbs and tail modified to provide propulsion underwater. Their closest extant relatives are the hippos, which are artiodactyls, from which cetaceans descended; cetaceans are thus also artiodactyls.

Parvorder: Mysticeti
Family: Balaenidae
Genus: Balaena
 Bowhead whale, Balaena mysticetus LC
Genus: Eubalaena
 North Atlantic right whale, Eubalaena glacialis EN
Family: Balaenopteridae
Subfamily: Balaenopterinae
Genus: Balaenoptera
 Northern minke whale, Balaenoptera acutorostrata LC
 North Atlantic minke whale, B. a. acutorostrata
 Blue whale, Balaenoptera musculus EN
 Northern blue whale, B. m. musculus
 Fin whale, Balaenoptera physalus VU
 Northern fin whale, B. p. physalusSubfamily: Megapterinae
Genus: Megaptera Humpback whale, Megaptera novaeangliae LC
Parvorder: Odontoceti
Superfamily: Platanistoidea
Family: Monodontidae
Genus: Monodon Narwhal, Monodon monoceros LC
Genus: Delphinapterus Beluga, Delphinapterus leucas LC
Family: Phocoenidae
Genus: Phocoena Harbour porpoise, Phocoena phocoena LC
 North Atlantic harbour porpoise, P. p. phocoenaFamily: Physeteridae
Genus: Physeter Sperm whale, Physeter macrocephalus VU
Family: Ziphidae
Subfamily: Hyperoodontinae
Genus: Hyperoodon Northern bottlenose whale, Hyperoodon ampullatus DD
Family: Delphinidae (marine dolphins)
 Genus: Lagenorhynchus White-beaked dolphin, Lagenorhynchus albirostris LC
 Atlantic white-sided dolphin, Lagenorhynchus acutus LC
Genus: Tursiops Common bottlenose dolphin, Tursiops truncatus LC
 Atlantic bottlenose dolphin, T. t. truncatusGenus: Stenella Striped dolphin, Stenella coeruleoalba LC
Genus: Orcinus Orca, Orcinus orca DD
Genus: Globicephala Long-finned pilot whale, Globicephala melas'' LC

See also
Flora and fauna of Greenland
List of chordate orders
Lists of mammals by region
List of prehistoric mammals
Mammal classification
List of mammals described in the 2000s

Notes

References

Lists of Western Hemisphere mammals from north to south

Greenland
Mammals
Greenland